The 2017–18 Lafayette Leopards men's basketball team represented Lafayette College during the 2017–18 NCAA Division I men's basketball season. The Leopards, led by 23rd-year head coach Fran O'Hanlon, played their home games at the Kirby Sports Center in Easton, Pennsylvania as members of the Patriot League. They finished the season 10–21, 7–11 in Patriot League play to finish in seventh place. They defeated American in the first round of the Patriot League tournament before losing in the quarterfinals to Colgate.

Previous season
The Leopards finished the 2016–17 season 9–21, 5–13 in Patriot League play to finish in a tie for ninth place. As the No. 10 seed in the Patriot League tournament, they lost in the first round to Loyola (MD).

Offseason

2017 recruiting class

Roster

Schedule and results

|-
!colspan=9 style=| Exhibition

|-
!colspan=9 style=| Regular season

|-
!colspan=9 style=| Patriot League regular season

|-
!colspan=9 style=| Patriot League tournament

See also
2017–18 Lafayette Leopards women's basketball team

References

Lafayette Leopards men's basketball seasons
Lafayette
Lafayette
Lafayette